Grace Nweke is a New Zealand netball international. She first competed for New Zealand in September 2021, becoming the fourth person of African descent to play for the team, following in the footsteps of Irene Van Dyk, Leana de Bruin and Karin Burger, all born in South Africa.

Early life
Grace Nweke was born in Auckland on 7 February 2002, to parents who emigrated to New Zealand from Nigeria. She has a twin brother and four other siblings. Her parents initially left Nigeria to go to South Korea, before settling in Auckland in the 1990s. She attended ACG Sunderland from years 9 to 10 then transferred to Avondale College. At Avondale College she competed in high jump events as well as netball. Nweke is studying for a Bachelor of Commerce degree in information systems and marketing at the University of Auckland.

Playing career

Northern Mystics
Nweke joined the Northern Mystics for the 2019 ANZ Premiership season, while she was still at school. Initially recruited to be a training partner she was rapidly promoted to being a full-time member of the Mystics squad. In 2021 she set a new ANZ Premiership scoring record, scoring 852 goals from 951 attempts and scoring 50 or more goals in 12 of the Mystics' 16 games. Her performances inevitably brought her to the attention of the national selectors, who selected her initially for the Under-21 side and then for the full 2021-22 New Zealand squad. 
Nweke missed four matches of the 2022 ANZ Premiership season due to an ankle injury; she was cleared to play the Grand Final but the Northern Mystics were defeated by the Northern Stars

New Zealand

Nweke was thought to be a player that will get selected for the 2019 Netball World Cup based on her 2019 performance in the ANZ Premiership but ultimately was not selected by Noeline Taurua citing fitness issues and being too young.
Nweke made her national debut on 22 September 2021 against England in a 2021 Taini Jamison Trophy Series match but this ended in disappointment as the team lost 55-45.
In 2021 she was nominated at the Halberg Awards for the Emerging Talent Award but lost out to swimmer Erika Fairweather.  
Nweke was selected for the 2022 Commonwealth Games in Birmingham and was noted as having a standout performance in the Bronze medal final against England, when New Zealand won 55-48.  Nweke's stellar performance was again followed up in the 2022 Constellation Cup against the Australian Diamonds having never come up against Australian players her shooting form was noted as being flawless, despite this, the Silver Ferns ended up losing the tournament 2-2 to the Australian Diamonds.
Nweke was selected for the 2023 Netball Quad Series in Cape Town and was the only player of the Silver Ferns team to play four full games, however the Silver Ferns lost to the Australian Diamonds in the final 56-50. Further recognition and praise was gained when she won the best shooter and overall player of the series.

Honours
New Zealand
Bronze medal: 2022 Commonwealth Games

Northern Mystics
ANZ Premiership
Winners: 2021

Personal Honours

At the 2022 Netball awards Nweke was awarded the Dame Lois Muir Supreme Award shared with fellow Silver Ferns player Kelly Jury, as well as the Silver Ferns Player of the Year .

References

2002 births
Living people
New Zealand netball players
New Zealand international netball players
ANZ Premiership players
Northern Mystics players
National Netball League (New Zealand) players
New Zealand people of Nigerian descent
People educated at Avondale College
University of Auckland alumni
21st-century New Zealand women
Commonwealth Games bronze medallists for New Zealand
Commonwealth Games medallists in netball
Netball players at the 2022 Commonwealth Games
Medallists at the 2022 Commonwealth Games